The Restroom Access Act, also known as Ally's Law, is legislation passed by several U.S. states that requires retail establishments that have toilet facilities for their employees to also allow customers to use the facilities if the customer has a medical condition requiring immediate access to a toilet, such as inflammatory bowel disease or Crohn’s disease.

Background
The law is named for Ally Bain, a 14-year-old girl from Illinois who had a flare-up of her Crohn's disease while shopping at a large retail store and was subsequently denied use of the employee-only restroom, causing her to soil herself. Bain's mother vowed it would never happen to anyone else. The two met with Illinois State Representative Kathy Ryg, helped her draft a bill, and testified before a committee at the state capital. The bill was signed into law in August 2005, making Illinois the first U.S. state to do so.

Where in force
As of January, 2023, at least 18 U.S. states had passed versions of the law. They include California, Colorado, Connecticut, Illinois, Kentucky, Louisiana, Maryland, Massachusetts, Michigan, Minnesota, New Hampshire, New York, Ohio, Oregon, Tennessee, Texas, Wisconsin, and Washington. A Virginia bill, which would have levied fines of $100 for non-compliance, was shelved due to concerns about exposing businesses to lawsuits, as well as concerns about security and intellectual property.

There is support for a federal version of the act, but some small-business people object to the public using their employee bathrooms.

Applicability
In general, each state requires that the customer present a document signed by a medical professional attesting that the customer uses an ostomy device or has Crohn's disease, ulcerative colitis, or other inflammatory bowel disease or medical condition requiring access to a toilet facility without delay. In at least two states, Oregon and Tennessee, the customer can present an identification card issued by a national organization advocating for the eligible medical condition.

Some states also include pregnancy as a covered medical condition.

Sample law
The Restroom Access Act of Illinois states:

Courtesy card
In Australia, the association Crohn's & Colitis Australia (CCA) encourages businesses to support people with such medical conditions by recognizing the Can't Wait Card issued by the CCA. The CCA states:
Crohn's & Colitis Australia (CCA) is inviting retailers, business owners and venue operators to show their support for people with the medical condition Crohn's and colitis, collectively known as inflammatory bowel disease (IBD), by displaying a window sticker recognising the Can't Wait Card in their store.

Other countries including the UK have similar programs of voluntary participation by businesses, one such program in the UK is the Bladder & Bowel Community's Just Can't Wait Card FREE Just Can't Wait Toilet Card

A card with no country specific indications is available explaining the possibility of legislation and the gravity of the card holders disability and need for restroom access.

References

Accessibility
Gastrointestinal tract disorders
Restrooms in the United States
United States state health legislation